United Nations General Assembly Resolution 1761 was passed on 6 November 1962 in response to the racist policies of apartheid established by the South African Government.

Condemnation of apartheid 
The resolution deemed apartheid and the policies enforcing it to be a violation of South Africa's obligations under the UN Charter and a threat to international peace and security.

Call for a voluntary boycott 
Additionally, the resolution requested Member States to break off diplomatic relations with South Africa, to cease trading with South Africa (arms exports in particular), and to deny passage to South African ships and aircraft.

Establishment of the UN Special Committee on Apartheid 
The resolution also established the United Nations Special Committee against Apartheid. The committee was originally boycotted by the Western nations, because of their disagreement with the aspects of the resolution calling for the boycott of South Africa. Even so, the committee found allies in the West, such as the British-based Anti-Apartheid Movement, through which it could work and lay the ground roots for the eventual acceptance by the Western powers of the need to impose economic sanctions on South Africa to pressure for political changes.

See also 
 Anti-Apartheid Movement
 Disinvestment from South Africa
 International sanctions during apartheid

References 

1761
International opposition to apartheid in South Africa
Boycotts of apartheid South Africa
1962 in law
1962 in the United Nations
1962 in South Africa
November 1962 events
South Africa and the United Nations